The chajá cake is a typical dessert in Uruguayan cuisine. It was created on April 27, 1927 by Orlando Castellano, the owner of the Confitería Las Familias in the city of Paysandú. It originated as a semi-industrialized confectionery and as it, is exported to Argentina, Brazil, Paraguay and United States

This dessert owes its name to the Southern screamer, a bird (locally known as the chajá) native to the central and southern parts of South America.

The main ingredients to this dessert are meringue, sponge cake (bizcochuelo), cream (crema de leche; crema doble) and fruits (typically peaches and strawberries are added). Variations of this dessert can be elaborated on by adding dulce de leche or chocolate.

References

External links
 

Uruguayan cuisine
Uruguayan inventions
Meringue desserts
Sponge cakes